Dipolog is the capital of Province of Zamboanga del Norte, Philippines. This article lists those schools, colleges and universities.

Universities
Jose Rizal Memorial State University - Dipolog Campus, Turno (November 20, 1961 )

Colleges

Former colleges
STI College Dipolog, Miputak

Private elementary & high schools

Public elementary schools
Dipolog Pilot Demonstration School (Central)
Miputak East Central School
Sta. Isabel Elementary School
Sta. Filomena Elementary School
Galas Elementary School
Sicayab Elementary School
Linabo Elementary School (Lugdungan)
Barra Elementary School

Public high schools
Philippine Science High School Zamboanga Peninsula Region Campus (Cogon)
Zamboanga del Norte National High School
Main Campus (Estaka)
Turno Campus (Lower Turno)
Miputak National High School (formerly Miputak West Elementary School and ZNNHS Miputak Extension)
Dipolog City National High School (Barra)
Galas National High School
Punta National High School
Alberto Q. Ubay Memorial Agro-Technical Science High School (Olingan)
Pamansalan Eco-Tech High School
Cogon National High School
Sicayab National High School
Gulayon Integrated School

Vocational and Technical Schools
Ben Villarino Vocational School, Inc.
Deuel Technical Institute
Dipolog Computer Systems, Inc.
Dipolog School of Fisheries
Livelihood Skills Development and Enhancement Center
ZN Agri-Technical Institute, Inc.

References

Education in Dipolog
Education in Zamboanga del Norte
Dipolog